The 4th Infantry Division, Philippine Army, known officially as the Diamond Division, is one of the Philippine Army's infantry units in Northern Mindanao.

History
On January 15, 1946, right after the World War II, upon the reestablishment of the Commonwealth Government, all Military Districts were converted to military areas; Pursuant to Section 1 General Orders Number 46 of HAFP dated January 8, 1946. The 1st and 2nd Military Areas (IMA-IIMA) was in Luzon, while 3rd Military Area (IIIMA) in the Visayas, and the 4th Military Area (IVMA) in Mindanao. The remaining forces of the 10th MD were absorbed to Military Police Command (MPC) based at Camp Overton, Iligan.

Mission
4th Infantry (Diamond) Division conducts internal security operations to dismantle four (4) priority New People's Army fronts and degrade three (3) priority New People's Army areas in Caraga region and portion of Region 10 by 2009 to attain a physically and psychologically secure environment conducive to continuous development.

Current line units

Brigades
 401st Infantry (UNITY) Brigade - The 401st  Infantry (UNITE ‘N FIGHT) Brigade, 4th Infantry (DIAMOND)  Division, Philippine Army traces its humble beginnings from the 4th Infantry Brigade, 4th Infantry Division; the 1st Infantry (1/4)Brigade, 4th Infantry Division; and to its present designation - the 401ST Infantry Brigade, 4th Infantry Division, Philippine Army. On 15 July 1973, the 4th Infantry Brigade was renamed “1st Infantry Brigade”.
 402nd Infantry (STINGERS) Brigade
 403rd Infantry (PEACEMAKER) Brigade

Battalions
 8th Infantry (DEPENDABLE) Battalion
 23rd Infantry (MASIGASIG) Battalion
 29th Infantry (MATATAG) Battalion
 30th Infantry (PYTHON) Battalion
 36th Infantry (del fierro VALOR) Battalion
 26th Infantry (EVER ONWARD) Battalion
 58th Infantry (DIMALULUPIG) Battalion
 75th Infantry (MARAUDER) Battalion
 88th Infantry (MARINGAL) Battalion

Service Support Units (SSU)
 Camp Evangelista Station Hospital (CESH)
 Headquarters and Headquarters Service Battalion (HHSBn)
 Service Support Battalion (SSBn)
 4th Division Training School (4DTS)
 4th Army Training Unit (4ATG)
 10th Field Artillery Battalion  (10FAB)
 Civil Military Operations Battalion (CMOBn)
 10th Forward Service Support Unit, ASCOM, PA (10FSSU)

See also
 Armed Forces of the Philippines
 Philippine Army
 AFP Eastern Mindanao Command
 Edilberto Evangelista

References

External links
 Official Site of the PA 4ID
 Philippine Army
 Eastern Mindanao Command, Armed Forces of the Philippines

Infantry divisions of the Philippines
Military units and formations established in the 1940s